Southampton is a station on the Montauk Branch of the Long Island Rail Road, on North Main Street between Prospect Street and Willow Street in Southampton, New York. (Prospect and Willow Streets are on the west side of North Main Street, but the station is located on the east side.)

History 
Southampton station was opened in February 1871, then razed and rebuilt in 1902. The station is part of the village's North Main Street Historic District, which has been on the National Register of Historic Places since 1986.  A freight house was also added across the tracks from this station, but it was severely neglected, and was finally demolished in 2006.

Station layout
The station has one eight-car-long high-level side platform on the south side of the main track. Two siding tracks are on the north side of the main track.

References

External links 

Unofficial LIRR History Website Photo (March 2000)
Southampton Station Freight House(TrainsAreFun.com)
Unofficial LIRR Photography Site
Southampton Station

Long Island Rail Road stations in Suffolk County, New York
The Hamptons, New York
Long Island Rail Road
Railway stations in the United States opened in 1871
Historic district contributing properties in New York (state)
National Register of Historic Places in Suffolk County, New York
Railway stations on the National Register of Historic Places in New York (state)
1871 establishments in New York (state)